Thana Theke Aschi is a 1965 Bengali film directed by Hiren Nag. It is an adaptation of the English play An Inspector Calls. The film starring Uttam Kumar in lead role as inspector Tin Kari Halder. Others cast like Madhabi Mukherjee, Kamal Mitra, Chaya Debi playing supporting role. The film remembered Uttam's one of the finest performance ever. This is also remembered as greatest thriller film in Bengali cinema. The film become successful at the box office.

Plot
Chandra Madhab Sen, an industrialist, finds his life changed with the arrival of Tinkari Haldar, a sub-inspector, at his doorstep inquiring about a suicide mystery.

Cast
 Uttam Kumar as Tin Kari Halder
 Madhabi Mukherjee
 Kamal Mitra as industrialist 
 Chaya Debi
 Anjana Bhowmick
 Dilip Mukherjee
 Ardhendu Mukherjee
 Jahor Roy
 Bireswar Sen
 Pranab Roy

Soundtrack

Reception
The film has been regarded as one of the finest thriller films ever made. Uttam Kumar as Inspector Tinkari Haldar gave one of his finest performances ever and his performance gained  overwhelming appreciation all over India. The film became hit at the box office.

Remake
The film is remade again in Bengali in 2010 as same name Thana Theke Aschi. Film starring Pramabrata Chatteejee, Sabyasachi Chakraborty, Paoli Daam, Rudranil Ghosh and Dulal Lahiri.

References

1960s Bengali-language films
Bengali-language Indian films